The following is a list of the 18 municipalities (comuni) of the Province of Ravenna, Emilia-Romagna, Italy.

List

See also
List of municipalities of Italy

References

 01
Ravenna